Pascal was a protected cruiser of the French Navy built in the 1890s, the second and final member of the . The Descartes-class cruisers were ordered as part of a construction program directed at strengthening the fleet's cruiser force. At the time, France was concerned with the growing naval threat of the Italian and German fleets, and the new cruisers were intended to serve with the main fleet, and overseas in the French colonial empire.

Pascal had a fairly short and uneventful career; after entering service in 1897, she was sent to French Indochina, where she served for the next seven years. During this period, she was part of the French squadron that responded to the Boxer Uprising in Qing China. In poor condition by 1904, she saw little further use and was struck from the naval register in 1911, thereafter being broken up.

Design

In response to a war scare with Italy in the late 1880s, the French Navy embarked on a major construction program in 1890 to counter the threat of the Italian fleet and that of Italy's ally Germany. The plan called for a total of seventy cruisers for use in home waters and overseas in the French colonial empire. The Descartes class, which comprised  and Pascal, was ordered to as part of the program. The design for the Descartes class was based on the earlier cruiser , but was enlarged to incorporate a more powerful gun armament.

She displaced  as designed. Her crew varied over the course of her career, and consisted of 383–401 officers and enlisted men. The ship's propulsion system consisted of a pair of triple-expansion steam engines driving two screw propellers. Steam was provided by sixteen coal-burning Belleville-type water-tube boilers that were ducted into two funnels.

The ship was armed with a main battery of four  guns. They were placed in individual sponsons clustered amidships, two guns per broadside. These were supported by a secondary battery of ten  guns, which were carried in sponsons, casemates, and individual pivot mounts. For close-range defense against torpedo boats, she carried eight  3-pounder Hotchkiss guns and four  1-pounder guns. She was also armed with two  torpedo tubes in her hull above the waterline. The main and secondary guns were fitted with  gun shields.

Service history
Work on Pascal began with her keel laying in Toulon on 4 December 1893. She was launched on 26 September 1895 and was commissioned to begin sea trials on 20 May 1896. During her initial testing, she was found to suffer from stability problems and had to receive additional ballast to correct the problem. Work on the ship was completed in 1897, and she was placed in full commission for active service on 1 June. On 6 July, she was assigned to the Mediterranean Squadron, based in Toulon. With the beginning of the unrest that led to the Boxer Uprising in Qing China in 1898, many European colonial powers began to reinforce their naval forces in East Asia.

Pascal remained in East Asian waters in 1899, along with Descartes and Duguay-Trouin, though Jean Bart was recalled home. After the uprising broke out in China late that year, the French considerably strengthened the squadron in the Far East; by January 1901, they had assembled a force of nine cruisers, including Pascal. She remained in East Asian waters in 1902, but with fighting over in China, the unit began to be reduced in size. In April that year, Pascal joined a naval review held for the Japanese Emperor Meiji in Kobe, Japan. The foreign naval contingent included the British pre-dreadnought battleship  and protected cruiser , the German protected cruiser , the Italian protected cruiser , and the Russian protected cruiser . In February that year, she was at Chemulpo Bay, Korea, when the Russo-Japanese War broke out. She and several other neutral warships observed the Battle of Chemulpo Bay on 9 February, and Pascal assisted in the rescue effort for Russian survivors of the cruiser  and the gunboat ; she later evacuated them to Saigon, French Indochina.

Pascal had returned to France by early 1905, and she was placed in reserve at Toulon on 15 February. She was to undergo a major overhaul, but a report dated 12 July determined that by the time work was completed in 1906, the military value of a reconditioned Pascal would be at best mediocre, and so the planned reconstruction was cancelled and the ship lay idle until she was decommissioned on 10 June 1909. The ship breaker M. Bénédic purchased Pascal that day and dismantled the ship in La Seyne-sur-Mer in 1912.

Notes

References
 
 
 
 
 
 
 
 
 
 
 
 
 

Descartes-class cruisers
Ships built in France
1895 ships